Caryodaphnopsis is a genus of 16 species belonging to the flowering plant family Lauraceae, distributed in tropical areas in southern North America, northern South America, and East and Southeast Asia.

They vary from 50-m-high trees to small trees or shrubs in lowland evergreen forest and rainforest.

The genus is distributed across the Pacific, with a marked geographical disjunction between Southeast Asia (South China, Vietnam, Laos, Cambodia, Indonesia, and the Philippines) and tropical America (Costa Rica to Brazil, crossing Peru, Ecuador, Colombia, and Venezuela).

Taxonomic history

Until 1985, the genus was only reported for tropical Asia, but van der Werff and Richter transferred two South American species of the genus Persea to Caryodaphnopsis.

Species 
Species include:

 Caryodaphnopsis baviensis (Lecomte) Airy Shaw	
 Caryodaphnopsis bilocellata van der Werff & Dao	
 Caryodaphnopsis burgeri N.Zamora & Poveda	
 Caryodaphnopsis cogolloi van der Werff	
 Caryodaphnopsis fieldii  & G.A.Romero	
 Caryodaphnopsis fosteri van der Werff	
 Caryodaphnopsis henryi Airy Shaw	
 Caryodaphnopsis inaequalis (A.C.Sm.) van der Werff & H.G.Richt.	
 Caryodaphnopsis laotica Airy Shaw	
 Caryodaphnopsis latifolia W.T.Wang	
 Caryodaphnopsis metallica Kosterm.	
 Caryodaphnopsis poilanei Kosterm.	
 Caryodaphnopsis theobromifolia (A.H.Gentry) van der Werff & H.G. Richt.	
 Caryodaphnopsis tomentosa van der Werff	
 Caryodaphnopsis tonkinensis (Lecomte) Airy Shaw

References

External links

Lauraceae genera
Taxonomy articles created by Polbot
Lauraceae